Symbol is a studio album by Japanese electronica artist Susumu Yokota, released in 2004. This album is distinctive from others in his discography by being primarily composed of samples from classical orchestral pieces, such as Tchaikovsky's Nutcracker Suite and Saint-Saëns's Carnival of the Animals, as well as more modern compositions by John Cage and Meredith Monk. The cover art is a detail from the 1896 painting Hylas and the Nymphs by John William Waterhouse.

Track listing

Notes

External links
 

Susumu Yokota albums
2005 albums